

Professional College

 College of Agriculture Vellanikkara, Mannuthy, കേരള കാർഷിക സർവ്വകലാശാല. തൃശ്ശൂർ.

Engineering Colleges
 Government Engineering College, Thrissur
 Holy Grace Academy of Engineering Mala, Thrissur
 I E S College of Engineering, Chittilappilly, Thrissur.
 MET's School of Engineering, Mala, Thrissur
 Nirmala College of Engineering, Kunnappilly, Thirissur
 Sahrdaya College of Engineering and Technology, Trissur
 Universal Engineering College, Kodungallur, Thrissur

Arts and Science Colleges
 Christ College, Irinjalakuda
 St. Thomas College, Thrissur
 St. Aloysius College, Thrissur
 Sree Kerala Varma College, Thrissur
College of Applied Science, Vadakkencherry
 Mother Arts and Science College Peruvallur, Thrissur
 Don Bosco College, Thrissur
 Sree Rama Varma Music School
 Sreenarayana College, Nattika
 Mahajubilee Training College, Mulloorkara

Law Colleges
 Government Law College, Thrissur

Schools
 Jawahar Navodaya Vidyalaya, Thrissur

References

 
Thrissur